Marcelo Demoliner and João Souza won the title by defeating Frederico Gil and Pedro Sousa 6–2, 6–4 in the final.

Seeds

Draw

Draw

References
 Main Draw

Peugeot Tennis Cup - Doubles
2012 Doubles